Karl Bjarni Guðmundsson aka Kalli Bjarni (born 6 January 1976 in Reykjavík, Iceland) is an Icelandic singer who rose to popularity after winning Idol Stjörnuleit, the Icelandic version of Pop Idol.

Arrest 
On 1 June 2007 he was arrested in Keflavik International Airport when coming from Frankfurt, Germany, and found to have 2 kilos of cocaine on his person. He was sentenced to two weeks custody while the authorities investigated whether the drugs were his or he was carrying the drugs for someone else.
His career went straight downhill after the first few months of Idol-fame. Prior to being arrested he had been working on a fishing boat.

Discography
Albums
Kalli Bjarni (2004)

References

1976 births
Living people
People from Reykjavík
Idol stjörnuleit
Idols (TV series) winners